Wheaten can refer to anything related to wheat, including wheat flour and wheat grain.

Wheaten bread, a type of Irish soda bread, using whole wheat grains
Wheaten cornflour, gluten powder sold under this name in Australia, also known as wheat starch
Soft-Coated Wheaten Terrier, a breed of dog originating in Ireland, named due to its wheat-like colour